353 Central Park West is an apartment building on the Upper West Side of Manhattan, New York City. It is located at the corner of Central Park West and West 95th Street.

The 19-story building with its landmark series of receding terraces creating a tower effect was built in 1992.

Trivia
353 Central Park West is one of the few residential buildings in the city whose top is illuminated at night.

Furthermore, 353 Central Park West is one of the few residential buildings in the city whose pinnacle height consists of active light fixtures.

References

Residential buildings completed in 1992
Apartment buildings in New York City
Residential skyscrapers in Manhattan
Condominiums and housing cooperatives in Manhattan
Upper West Side